Brian Hill is a director and writer living in New York City.  He is best known for writing the book for Disney's Bedknobs and Broomsticks, The Theory of Relativity and the Broadway musical The Story of My Life with composer/lyricist Neil Bartram. For his work on that show he was nominated for a Drama Desk Award for outstanding book of a musical.

He served as associate director of Disney's The Little Mermaid on Broadway.  He has also served in this position for the Toronto and Broadway productions of Disney's The Lion King and all three major Canadian companies of Forever Plaid.   He originated the role of Frankie, a role which garnered him a Dora Award for outstanding actor, in the original Canadian cast of Forever Plaid and has played Raoul in The Phantom of the Opera and Joe in Sunset Boulevard. He also spent three seasons with the prestigious Shaw Festival.

Works

Bedknobs and Broomsticks with composer/lyricist Neil Bartram
The Theory of Relativity with composer/lyricist Neil Bartram - commissioned by Sheridan College - written specifically for college age students - Goodspeed Musicals - directed by Brian Hill - licensed through Music Theatre International
The Story of My Life with composer/lyricist Neil Bartram - directed by Richard Maltby Jr. - nominated for four Drama Desk Awards for outstanding musical, music, lyrics and book of a musical. - licensed through Music Theatre International
Something Wicked This Way Comes with composer/lyricist Neil Bartram
The Adventures of Pinocchio with composer/lyricist Neil Bartram - licensed through Concord Theatricals
Brigadoon - revised book - Goodman Theatre - directed by Rachel Rockwell
Spin with composer/lyricist Neil Bartram - Signature Theatre - directed by Eric Schaeffer
October Sky - revised book - Old Globe Theatre - directed by Rachel Rockwell
You Are Here with composer/lyricist Neil Bartram - Thousand Islands Playhouse, Goodspeed Musicals, Southwark Playhouse
Senza Luce with composer/lyricist Neil Bartram - Goodspeed Musicals, Sheridan College

References

Year of birth missing (living people)
Living people
Male actors from Kitchener, Ontario
American male stage actors
Canadian male stage actors
American theatre directors
Canadian theatre directors
American male dramatists and playwrights
Canadian male dramatists and playwrights
Canadian expatriate male actors in the United States
Writers from Kitchener, Ontario
American musical theatre librettists
Canadian musical theatre librettists
Dora Mavor Moore Award winners